Joseph Patrick Teasdale (March 29, 1936 – May 8, 2014) was an American politician. A Democrat, he served as the 48th Governor of Missouri from 1977 to 1981.

Early life and education
Teasdale was born in Kansas City, Missouri to William and Adah Downey Teasdale. Teasdale's father was a prominent Kansas City attorney,
His grandfather, William B. Teasdale, was also an attorney, prosecutor, and member of the Missouri State Senate and considered "One of the men who made Kansas City." Joseph Teasdale and his three sisters were raised as devout Catholics. Teasdale was a multi-sport athlete while attending Rockhurst High School and would later be inducted into the school's Athletic Hall of Fame. Following graduation from high school, he attended St. Benedict's College (now Benedictine College) in Atchison, Kansas where he was a member of the school's 1954 NAIA National Champion basketball team. Teasdale later earned an undergraduate degree from Rockhurst University, and a law degree from Saint Louis University School of Law.

Career
From 1962 to 1966, Teasdale served as Assistant United States Attorney for the Western District of Missouri, where among his duties included leading the organized crime division. In the early-1960s, he enlisted in the United States Air Force Reserve, with his primary duty being at Whiteman Air Force Base where Airman 3rd Class Teasdale performed legal staff duties for the 442nd Military Airlift Wing. Teasdale was elected Prosecuting Attorney for Jackson County, Missouri in 1966, becoming the youngest person to ever hold that office. He ran his first statewide campaign in the 1972 election, seeking the Democratic gubernatorial nomination. Although he was defeated in the primary by Edward L. Dowd, his innovative campaign style earned him name recognition around Missouri and a nickname, "Walkin' Joe," inspired by his habit of walking door-to-door to greet potential supporters. It is thought that Teasdale appropriated the tactic from Florida politician "Walkin' Lawton Chiles. Teasdale campaign officials estimated that he had walked over 1,000 miles in the months leading up to the primary. Even though he lost the primary to Ed Dowd it set the stage for Teasdale to run again in 1976.

Teasdale's win in the 1976 Missouri gubernatorial election was considered an upset. Running on a platform of working for common Missourians and vowing to fight big utility company rate hikes, Teasdale painted first-term incumbent Kit Bond as being too friendly to big business interests. The tactic proved successful with many voters angered at Bond's approval of rate hikes, and in what many considered an upset Teasdale was elected governor by 13,000 votes. The victory prompted CBS News anchorman Dan Rather to quip on the air "..the story in the Midwest is not Jimmy Carter, it's Walkin' Joe Teasdale!"

Governor
During his tenure, Teasdale fought against utility companies by appointing new members to the Missouri Public Service Commission, the state agency tasked with approving or denying rates. Teasdale also established the state's first Division of Aging, boosting funding for the Department of Mental Health, and overseeing the rewriting of numerous health laws. Teasdale also advocated strongly for the Nursing Home Reform Act and removal of sales tax on prescription drugs. He proved willing to reach across party lines as well, supporting Republican Mel Hancock's amendment to limit state taxes. Teasdale also came out strongly against the Meramec Dam project which would have greatly affected rivers in areas southwest of St. Louis. He signed legislation reinstating the death penalty in Missouri in 1977, but later regretted the decision. In 1980 Teasdale made state history by becoming the first Missouri governor in 140 years to have a veto overridden by the state legislature. He angered many in his own party by opposing the cost of constructing the Harry S. Truman state office building in Jefferson City. That anger manifested itself again in 1980 as Teasdale faced a tough Democratic primary challenge from then-State Treasurer Jim Spainhower. He was successful in defeating Spainhower but lost in the November 1980 general election against Kit Bond.

Later career 
After leaving the governorship in early-1981, Teasdale returned to the Kansas City area and established a law practice. One of his most notable cases was representing victims and surviving family of the Hyatt Regency walkway collapse. An avid outdoorsman all his life, he often spent time on hunting and fishing trips. Teasdale largely avoided state politics after his defeat, telling one newspaper reporter in 1993 "I wanted to become a normal person again, and I really wasn't normal before. For 20 years I was completely consumed by politics." In the late 1990s, his position on capital punishment having changed, he worked to achieve clemency for David Leisure, a man convicted of murder for a 1980 car bombing in St. Louis.

Personal life
In 1973, Teasdale was married to the former Theresa Ferkenhoff. The couple had three sons, Bill, John, and Kevin. His middle son, John, was a multisport standout at Rockhurst High School like his father before him, and later played offensive tackle at the University of Notre Dame.

Teasdale died on May 8, 2014, in Kansas City, Missouri, of complications from pneumonia.

Election history

References

|-

1936 births
2014 deaths
Assistant United States Attorneys
Benedictine College alumni
Catholics from Missouri
Democratic Party governors of Missouri
Lawyers from Kansas City, Missouri
Politicians from Kansas City, Missouri
Rockhurst University alumni
Saint Louis University School of Law alumni
United States Air Force airmen
Deaths from pneumonia in Missouri
20th-century American lawyers